The Juno Award for Contemporary Roots Album of the Year is presented annually at Canada's Juno Awards to honour the best album of the year in the contemporary roots and folk genre. Prior to 2016, awards for this genre were awarded in two categories: Roots & Traditional - Solo and Roots & Traditional - Group. Beginning with the 2016 ceremony, the solo and group categories were replaced with contemporary and traditional roots categories, to "ensure two genres of music are not competing against each other in the same category".

Winners and nominees

References

Contemporary Roots
Album awards
Folk music awards